Brimeda is a locality and minor local entity located in the municipality of Villaobispo de Otero, in León province, Castile and León, Spain. As of 2020, it has a population of 100.

Geography 
Brimeda is located 55km west-southwest of León.

References

Populated places in the Province of León